The Swedish Vacuum Solar Telescope was a 47.5 cm solar telescope on La Palma in the Canary Islands. It was removed on 28 August 2000, and has been superseded by the Swedish 1-m Solar Telescope.

The Swedish Vacuum Solar Telescope awaits re-assembly by its current owner, the Chabot Space and Science Center in Oakland California, United States.

See also
 Swedish Solar Telescope
 List of solar telescopes

References 

Solar telescopes
Science and technology in the San Francisco Bay Area